The fifth season of the Brazilian version of the reality television show De Férias com o Ex, premieres on MTV on Thursday, October 3, 2019.

Cast 

Bold indicates original cast member; all other cast were brought into the series as an ex.

{| class="wikitable sortable"
! Name
! Notability
! Exes
|-
| Any Borges
| Digital influencer
|João Gabriel Brey
|-
| Cinthia Cruz
| Actress
| Gabriel Romano
|-
| Fabio Beltrão
| Actor
| 
|-
| Luiz Felipe Ribeiro (Lipe)
| Digital influencer
| Marcelle Casagrande, Yasmin Burihan
|-
| Flavio Nakagima
| Surfer
| Gabrielle Fernandes
|-
| Gui Araújo
| Digital influencer
| Catherine Bascoy, Vitória Bellato
|-
| Hana Khalil
| Youtuber'
| Bruno Toledo, Jonas Bento
|-
| Leo Picon
| Digital influencer
|
|-
| MC Rebecca
| Singer
|
|-
| Rafaela Porto
| Singer
| 
|-
| Stefani Bays
| Digital influencer
| 
|-
| Túlio Rocha
| Youtuber| Mirela Janis, Catherine Bascoy
|-
! style="background:#000;" colspan="6"|
|-
| Mirela Janis
| Digital influencer
| Túlio Rocha
|-
| Gabriel Romano
| Singer
| Cinthia Cruz
|-
| Marcelle Casagrande
| Investor
| Lipe Ribeiro, Bruno Toledo
|-
| Catherine Bascoy
| Digital influencer
| Gui Araújo, Túlio Rocha
|-
| João Gabriel Brey
| Businessmen
| Any Borges
|-
| Vitória Bellato
| Digital influencer
| Gui Araújo, Rafael Devecz
|-
| Gabrielle Fernandes
| Actress
| Flavio Nakagima, Rodrigo Senna
|-
| Bruno Toledo
| Model
| Hana Khalil, Marcelle Casagrande
|-
| Rodrigo Senna (Digow)
| Model
| Gabrielle Fernandes
|-
| Yasmin Burihan (Yá)
| Digital influencer
| Lipe Ribeiro
|-
| Jonas Bento
| Rapper
| Hana Khalil
|-
| Rafael Devecz
| Model
| Vitória Bellato
|-
|}

 Duration of cast 

 Key:  = "Cast member" is featured in this episode
 Key:  = "Cast member" arrives on the beach
 Key:  = "Cast member" has an ex arrive on the beach
 Key:  = "Cast member" has two exes arrive on the beach
 Key:  = "Cast member" arrives on the beach and has an ex arrive during the same episode
 Key:  = "Cast member" leaves the beach
 Key:  = "Cast member" has an ex arrive on the beach and leaves during the same episode
 Key:  = "Cast member" arrives on the beach and leaves during the same episode
 Key:  = "Cast member" does not feature in this episode

Future Appearances

After this season, in 2020, Lipe Ribeiro and Stéfani Bays appeared in A Fazenda 12. Lipe finished in 4th place, while Stéfani finished in 3rd place.

In 2021, Mirela Janis appeared with his boyfriend Yugnir Ângelo in Power Couple Brasil 5, they finished in 8th place in the competition.

In 2021, Any Borges appeared in Ilha Record 1, where she won the competition.

In 2021, Gui Araújo appeared in A Fazenda 13, he finished in 11th place in the competition.

In 2022, Flavio Nakagima appeared in Ilha Record 2'', where he won the competition.

References

External links
Official website 

De Férias com o Ex seasons
2019 Brazilian television seasons
Ex on the Beach